Canon's series of L lenses (Luxury lenses) are a professional line of photography lenses made by Canon. Canon has sold zoom and prime L-series lenses for the discontinued FD lens mount, for the current EF lens mount used on all Canon EOS SLR cameras and for the RF mount used on full-frame mirrorless interchangeable-lens cameras.

Characteristics

Canon L series lenses have a red ring around the lens barrel and the letter "L".  Some models of L lenses utilize an infrared reflective heat shield coating. Most L series lenses share a number of common characteristics not found in Canon's line of lower-end lenses. L lenses tend to be more durable, incorporating dust and water-resistant rubber seals on some models. L lenses also contain optics of higher quality, with many lenses containing aspherically ground, fluorite or ultra-low dispersion glass elements. Their front elements do not rotate for the proper operation of some filters, such as circular polarizers. L lenses are often "fast", with maximum apertures commonly 2.8 or 4, and, with the exception of the RF 100–500 mm f/4.5–7.1L IS USM lens, never exceeding 5.6. Standard prime lenses have a much greater maximum aperture, such as Canon's current 50mm and 85mm L lenses which open to  1.2. All current L-series lenses have ultrasonic autofocus motors (USM) and extra communication pins, except for the specialist tilt-shift lenses which do not provide auto focus.

Larger sized L-lenses, such as the 70–200 mm, 100–400 mm zooms, and longer focal length primes (300 mm+), usually have an off-white barrel to reduce heat absorption under the sun that may otherwise affect the performance of the lens. 

Wide angle L-lenses typically have a gelatin filter holder on the mounting collar of the lens, which allows a gelatin to be installed behind the lens. Some telephoto L-lenses, such as the EF 70-200mm zoom lenses, or the EF 300mm f/4L IS USM do not have rear gelatin filter holders. Super-telephoto lenses such as the EF 500mm f/4L IS USM, or the EF 200mm f/2L IS USM have a rear 52mm drop-in filter holder which can be used to hold gelatin type filters.

According to Canon, its L series lenses areIncorporating specialized optical materials such as synthetic fluorite, Super UD and UD glass, and large-aperture high-precision aspherical lenses, only lenses that perform to the highest photographic standards are allowed to bear the designation ‘L’.

Lenses

EF mount zoom lenses

EF mount prime lenses

RF mount zoom lenses

RF mount prime lenses

Canon lens codes

On the back of Canon lenses is a six-digit code, which indicates where the lens was manufactured and when.

Example of a code "UV1212"

The first letter, 'U', represents the factory that made the lens.  Three possible first letters are:
{|
| U
| =
| Utsunomiya
|-
| F
| =
| Fukushima
|-
| O
| =
| Ōita
|-
|}

The second letter, 'V', represents the year of manufacture 
{|
|  A
| =
| 1960,
| 1986,
| 2012
|-
|  B
| =
| 1961,
| 1987,
| 2013
|-
|  C
| =
| 1962,
| 1988,
| 2014
|-
|  D
| =
| 1963,
| 1989,
| 2015
|-
|  E
| =
| 1964,
| 1990,
| 2016
|-
|  F
| =
| 1965,
| 1991,
| 2017
|-
|  G
| =
| 1966,
| 1992,
| 2018
|-
|  H
| =
| 1967,
| 1993,
| 2019
|-
|  I
| =
| 1968,
| 1994,
| 2020
|-
|  J
| =
| 1969,
| 1995
|-
|  K
| =
| 1970,
| 1996
|-
|  L
| =
| 1971,
| 1997
|-
|  M
| =
| 1972,
| 1998
|-
|  N
| =
| 1973,
| 1999
|-
|  O
| =
| 1974,
| 2000
|-
|  P
| =
| 1975,
| 2001
|-
|  Q
| =
| 1976,
| 2002
|-
|  R
| =
| 1977,
| 2003
|-
|  S
| =
| 1978,
| 2004
|-
|  T
| =
| 1979,
| 2005
|-
|  U
| =
| 1980,
| 2006
|-
|  V
| =
| 1981,
| 2007
|-
|  W
| =
| 1982,
| 2008
|-
|  X
| =
| 1983,
| 2009
|-
|  Y
| =
| 1984,
| 2010
|-
|  Z
| =
| 1985,
| 2011
|-
|}

The next two digits represent the month the lens was manufactured.

The last two digits are for internal Canon use.

Therefore, the example (pictured) of UV0512 means the lens was made in the Utsunomiya, Japan factory in May 2007.

See also
Canon EF lens mount
Canon RF mount

References

External links
At the-digital-picture.com:
Canon L Lens Series Information
 On Canon Website:
EF LENS WORK III